Full metal,  Fullmetal or full-metal may refer to:
Full metal jacket bullet

Media

Anime and manga 
Fullmetal Alchemist, manga and anime series
Full Metal Panic!, manga and anime series

Book 
Full Metal Jacket Diary, a 2005 book written by Matthew Modine

Films and documentaries 
Full Metal Jacket, a 1987 film
Full Metal Ninja, a 1989 film
Full Metal Yakuza, a 1997 film
Full Metal Village, a 2007 documentary film

Gaming 
Mad Stalker: Full Metal Forth, a game originally released for the Sharp X68000 in 1994 and then for other computers and video game consoles
Full Metal Madness, a 1995 Cyberbots game
Full Metal Daemon: Muramasa, a 2009 visual novel
Full Metal Furies, a 2018 game

Radio show 
Full Metal Jackie, a show hosted by Jackie Kajzer

TV series 
Full Metal Challenge, British television series
Full Metal Jousting, American reality television show

Wrestling 
Full Metal, Full Metal Mayhem wrestling event
WWF Full Metal